The Frederick Jackson Turner Award, is given each year by the Organization of American Historians for an author's first book on American history.

It was started in 1959, by Mississippi Valley Historical Association, as the Prize Studies Award.

See also 
 List of history awards

References

American history awards
Awards established in 1959
History books about the United States
American literary awards
1959 establishments in the United States
Organization of American Historians